Withering to Death (stylized Withering to death.) is the fifth studio album by Japanese heavy metal band Dir En Grey. Initially published in Japan on March 9, 2005, it was the band's first album to be officially released in Europe, North America and South Korea. In June 2006, Withering to Death reached number 42 on Billboard's "Top Heatseekers" chart. Amazon.com included Withering to Death in its listing of "Top 10 Hard Rock & Metal albums of 2006". In September 2007, Rolling Stone Japan rated it number 34 on its list of the "100 Greatest Japanese Rock Albums of All Time".

In Japan, a first press limited edition with a tannish cover in digi-pack and slipcase form with a red booklet was released, while the standard version has a black cover and a purple booklet. The American and European releases received the black cover and contained an additional DVD with the video of either -Saku- (United States/United Kingdom), "Dead Tree" (Germany), "Kodō" (France) or "The Final" (South Korea); along with live compilations of "Merciless Cult" and "Machiavellism", and selected footage from Tour04 The Code of Vulgar[ism]. A live version of the song "Merciless Cult" is on the Family Values Tour 2006 CD compilation.

Track listing

Personnel
 Yoshinori Abe – co-producer
 Tatsuya Sakamoto – recording, mixing, mastering
 Dynamite Tommy – executive producer
 Koji Yoda – art direction

Notes
"The Final" was re-recorded and released on their 2013 EP The Unraveling.
"Beautiful Dirt" was re-recorded and released on their 2018 best-of album Vestige of Scratches.

References

2005 albums
Dir En Grey albums
Free-Will albums